Launch Off to War is the debut album by the American Street punk band Cheap Sex, released in 2003 by Punk Core Records.

Track listing 
Launch Off to War (2:37)     
Consume and Consume (1:59)     
Take a Chance (2:26)     
Smash Your Symbols (2:12)     
Eyes See All (2:37)     
Dead Today (2:30)     
If Society... (2:34)     
Dick Cheney (1:57)     
Its Up to You (1:45)     
Living in Fear (2:17)     
Out on Your Own (2:54)     
Backstabber (1:58)

Credits
 Bernard Torelli - Mastering, Mixing
 Mange - Photography
 Sean Morrissey - Assistant
Mike Virus - Vocals
 Johnny O. Negative - Guitar, Engineer
 Gabe Skunt - Drums, Layout Design
 J. Ace Von Johnson - Guitar

Cheap Sex albums
Punk Core Records albums
2003 debut albums